Scherri-Lee Biggs is a South African-Australian TV host, dancer, model and beauty pageant titleholder who was crowned Miss Universe Australia 2011 and represented Australia at Miss Universe 2011 and placed Top 10.

Biggs currently presents the weather on Nine News Perth.

Early life
Biggs was born in South Africa and emigrated with her family to Perth, Australia when she was 8, where she attended St Mary's Anglican Girls' School. From a young age, she was schooled in dance and ballet, but she pursued a career in modelling at age 16, after being scouted by Vivien's modelling agency.

Miss Universe
Biggs, a popular delegate and favourite to win the competition, became Miss Universe Australia on 7 July 2011 in a ceremony held at Melbourne's Sofitel hotel, outdoing 21 other delegates from across the country. This certified her with a place in the Miss Universe pageant, held in São Paulo, Brazil on 12 September 2011, finishing in the Top 10.

Career
After competing in Miss Universe, Scherri-Lee began working with the Seven Network in Melbourne where she was a reporter for sporting events broadcast on Seven Sport and daily travel show Coxy's Big Break until two years later, where she moved to Perth.

In August 2014, Biggs was announced as the new weather presenter on Nine News Perth replacing Sally Ayhan. She remains as the current weather presenter as of 2020 and has also covered events happening in Perth.

In October 2020, Biggs was announced as a celebrity contestant on the new season of The Celebrity Apprentice Australia in 2021.

Biggs is currently a fill in weather presenter on Today.

Personal life 
In February 2022 Biggs engagement to former Australian rules footballer Daniel Venables.was called off.

References

External links
 Scherri-Lee Biggs on Twitter

Living people
Miss Universe 2011 contestants
Australian beauty pageant winners
Models from Perth, Western Australia
South African emigrants to Australia
Miss Universe Australia winners
Nine News presenters
Australian women television journalists
Australian women television presenters
The Apprentice Australia candidates
People educated at St Mary's Anglican Girls' School
Year of birth missing (living people)